The 1969–70 Cypriot Second Division was the 15th season of the Cypriot second-level football league. Digenis Akritas Morphou FC won their 1st title.

Format
Seventeen teams participated in the 1969–70 Cypriot Second Division. All teams played against each other twice, once at their home and once away. The team with the most points at the end of the season crowned champions. The first team was promoted to 1970–71 Cypriot First Division. The last four teams were relegated to the 1970–71 Cypriot Third Division.

Changes from previous season
Teams promoted to 1969–70 Cypriot First Division
 Enosis Neon Paralimni FC

Teams that approved for membership in CFA
 Apollon Athienou
 LALL Lysi
 Chalkanoras Idaliou

Teams relegated from 1969–70 Cypriot First Division
 Evagoras Paphos

Moreover, Keravnos Strovolou FC return after one season. Furthermore, Ethnikos Asteras Limassol and Ethnikos Achna FC were competing in the league but after some games they were expelled.

League standings

See also
 Cypriot Second Division
 1969–70 Cypriot First Division
 1969–70 Cypriot Cup

References

Cypriot Second Division seasons
Cyprus
1969–70 in Cypriot football